The 2014 NHRA Mello Yello Drag Racing Season was announced on August 29, 2013.

There were 24 Top Fuel, Funny Car, and Pro Stock car events, and 16 Pro Stock Motorcycle events scheduled.

Schedule

NOTE: All races will be televised on ESPN or ESPN2.

1 The rules for the 4 Wide Nationals differ from other races:
 All cars will qualify on each lane as all four lanes will be used in qualifying.
 Three rounds with cars using all four lanes.
 In Rounds One and Two, the top two drivers (of four) will advance to the next round.
 The pairings are set as follows:
 Race One:  1, 8, 9, 16
 Race Two:  4, 5, 12, 13
 Race Three:  2, 7, 10, 15
 Race Four:  3, 6, 11, 14
 Semifinal One:  Top two in Race One and Race Two
 Semifinal Two:  Top two in Race Three and Race Four
 Finals:  Top two in Semifinal One and Semifinal Two
 Lane choice determined by times in previous round.  In first round, lane choice determined by fastest times.
 Drivers who advance in Rounds One and Two will receive 20 points for each round advancement.
 In Round Three, the winner of the race will be declared the race winner and will collect 40 points.  The runner-up will receive 20 points.  Third and fourth place drivers will be credited as semifinal losers.

2 Due to poor track conditions and rain, Final Eliminations were run on May 19.

3 Indianapolis:  The first winner in Funny Car and Pro Stock (car) is the winner of the Brainerd round that was cancelled because of weather and darkness.

4 Texas Motorplex:  Charlotte was cancelled because of rain and track conditions after the first round of Top Fuel and Funny Car had finished and half of the first round of Pro Stock (car) had concluded.  Therefore, there are two full races at the Texas Motorplex for Pro Stock Motorcycle, one race and 3 1/2 rounds for Pro Stock, and one race and three rounds for the two nitro classes.

Notable events
Morgan Lucas announced on October 14, 2013, that he was stepping aside from his full-time ride and announced his replacement driver, Richie Crampton.

Tommy Johnson, Jr. will now drive a funny car for Don Schumacher Racing, replacing Johnny Gray.

Final standings

References

External links
 Official website
 Official NHRA Drag Racing Podcasts
 Drag Race Central The Latest NHRA News and Analysis

NHRA Mello Yello
NHRA Mello Yello